Covert One: The Hades Factor (a.k.a. Robert Ludlum's Covert One: The Hades Factor, The Hades Factor) is a made-for-TV thriller filmed in Toronto that first aired in 2006. Directed by Mick Jackson, the miniseries is loosely based on The Hades Factor, a 2000 novel written by Gayle Lynds as part of the Covert-One series created by Robert Ludlum.

Plot
While in a retrieve operation of a virus in Berlin, the Covert One agent Rachel Russell is double-crossed by two dirty agents; she kills them and escapes, trying to find a hiding place and someone to trust to protect the vials. Meanwhile, the former Covert One agent Dr. Jon Smith is also in Berlin with his beloved fiancée Sophie Amsden participating in a congress. When three persons die with bleeding, the doctors disclose a Hades virus outbreak, an extreme rare Ebola variant. Jon and Sophie return to the US to research a cure, and Jon discovers a huge combination of bio-terrorism and conspiracy

Synopsis 
The Hades Factor concerns an outbreak of a doomsday virus in the United States. Stephen Dorff stars as Lt.Colonel.  Jonathan Smith, an expert in biochemistry who races around the globe trying to identify the source of the outbreak.

Distribution 
First broadcast as a two-part CBS miniseries in April 2006, Covert One: The Hades Factor has since aired as a film on Sky One. It was released on DVD by Sony Pictures.

Cast 
 Stephen Dorff as Jon Smith
 Mira Sorvino as Rachel Russell
 Blair Underwood as Palmer Addison
 Sophia Myles as Sophie Amsden
 Danny Huston as Fred Klein
 Colm Meaney as Peter Howell
 Josh Hopkins as Bill Griffin
 Jeffrey DeMunn as Mercer Haldane
 Anjelica Huston as President Castilla
 Rosemary Dunsmore as Nancy Langford
 Joris Jarsky as Tom Fancher
 Conrad Dunn as Ghalib Hassan
 Sergio Di Zio as Marty Zellerbach
 Karen Glave as Lt. Crowthers

External links

 

 Covert One: The Hades Factor at CBS.com
 Covert One: The Hades Factor at Tandem Communications

2000s thriller films
2000s spy films
Bioterrorism in fiction
Films based on American novels
Television shows based on American novels
Films based on works by Robert Ludlum
Films directed by Mick Jackson
Films about terrorism
Films shot in Toronto
Spy television films
Techno-thriller films